Ministigmata is a genus of spiders in the family Microstigmatidae. It was first described in 1981 by Raven & Platnick. , it contains only one species, Ministigmata minuta, from Brazil.

References

Microstigmatidae
Monotypic Mygalomorphae genera
Spiders of Brazil